The Nepal Defence Army is a mainly ethnic Terai armed pro-Hindu group in Nepal. They were responsible for a bombing of a church in Kathmandu in 2009, and also attempted another triple bombing in 2012.

They call for the return of the Nepalese Hindu Monarchy.

References

Nepalese Hindu political parties
Rebel groups in Nepal
Hinduism-motivated violence in India